Mertesdorf is a municipality in the Trier-Saarburg district, in Rhineland-Palatinate, Germany, near Trier. Grünhaus is a part of Mertesdorf.

External links
 www.mertesdorf.de

References

Trier-Saarburg